is a city and municipality in Telemark in the county of Vestfold og Telemark in Norway. It is part of the traditional region of Grenland.  The administrative centre of the municipality is the city of Porsgrunn.

The municipality of Porsgrunn was established on 1 January 1838 (see formannskapsdistrikt).  The town of Brevik and the rural district of Eidanger were merged into the municipality of Porsgrunn on 1 January 1964.

The conurbation of Porsgrunn and Skien is considered by Statistics Norway to be the seventh-largest city in Norway.

General information

Name
The place is first mentioned in 1576 ("Porsgrund") by the writer Peder Claussøn Friis in his work Concerning the Kingdom of Norway (see the article: Norwegian literature). He writes: "Two and a half miles from the sea, the Skien river flows into the fjord, and that place is called Porsgrund." The name was probably given during medieval times to the then swampy area by the nuns of Gimsøy Abbey, who went here to collect the shrub pors ("Bog Myrtle"), and the Norwegian word grunn meaning "ground". Prior to 1931, the name was spelled "Porsgrund".

Coat-of-arms
The coat of arms is from modern times.  They were granted on 16 January 1905.  The arms were devised in 1905 when the city needed a new city hall. The silver bend is the small river running through the city.  The upper half shows a silver-colored branch of bog myrtle on a red background and is thus a canting symbol. The silver anchor on a blue background symbolizes the importance of the local harbor.

History
 
Porsgrunn has been an important harbor town in the Grenland area since the late 16th century. In 1653, the Customs House was moved further down the Telemarksvassdraget from Skien to Porsgrunn mainly because industrial waste such as sawdust and mud made the river too shallow to allow boats to go any further up the river.  Moving the Custom House to Porsgrunn added to the flourishing harbor activity and Porsgrunn became a thriving market town.

In the 18th century, it was the home of some of Norway's most influential families at the time, such as the Aalls, Cappelens, Løvenskiolds, and Deichmans.  Also in this period, Porsgrunn was considered the cultural centre of Norway. On the ecclesiastical side, Porsgrunn was separated from the ancient rural parishes of Eidanger, Solum, and Gjerpen in 1764 to become a prestegjeld with its own minister.  Churches within the Porsgrunn prestegjeld include Østre Porsgrunn Church and Vestre Porsgrunn Church.  The city was granted limited city status in 1807, but this was expanded to full city status in 1842.

Porsgrunn was once home to Skomvær, the country's largest sailing ship.  In 1985, the sculpture Amphitrite, the wave and the sea birds was unveiled in Porsgrunn.  The sculpture, which is one of Jørleif Uthaug's best known works, has a nautical theme in honor of Porsgrunn's maritime history.

Geography

Porsgrunn borders the municipalities of Skien and Siljan to the north, Bamble in the west, and Larvik in the east. It is part of a cluster of municipalities in southern Telemark that constitute the Grenland area of Norway. The city is situated near Gunneklevfjord, and at the mouth of the river Telemarksvassdraget or Porsgrunn River (Porsgrunnselva). The peninsula of Herøya, southeast of the city, was originally an industrial park and has grown into a suburb of Porsgrunn.

Industry
Porsgrunn is an important center of industry and has a long history of heavy industry. Important industries in Porsgrunn include:

Transportation
Transportation links from Porsgrunn:
Bus (Oslo, Kristiansand, Notodden)
Train (stops at Porsgrunn Station)
The Vestfold Line to Drammen and onwards to Oslo
The Bratsberg Line to Skien and Notodden
Ferry (Fjordbåtene i Brevik)

Notable residents

Public Service & public thinking 
 Cort Adeler (1622-1675) a Norwegian/Danish admiral 
 Niels Aall (1769–1854) an estate owner, businessman and politician; built Ulefos Manor
 Severin Løvenskiold (1777–1856) a nobleman, politician and Prime Minister of Norway 1828/1841
 Thobias Petter Wiibe (1815-1891) politician, Mayor of Porsgrund, 1850s 
 Niels Mathiesen (1829–1900) a politician and merchant, Mayor of Porsgrund, 1860s to 1880s
 Jørgen Christian Knudsen (1843–1922) a Norwegian ship-owner and politician
 Johan Castberg (1862-1926) politician, Govt. Minister 1900s & 1910s
 Carl P. Wright (1893–1961) politician, Mayor of Porsgrund, 1930s
 Erik Hesselberg (1914–1972) a sailor, author, painter, sculptor and Kon-Tiki crewmember
 Einar Tufte-Johnsen (1915–1985) an aviation officer and head of NATO Defense College 
 Finn Kristensen (born 1936) electrician, trade unionist and Govt. Minister 1980s & 1990s
 Ann-Marit Sæbønes (born 1945) physiotherapist and first female Mayor of Oslo, 1992/1995
 Mads Gilbert (born 1947) a Norwegian physician, humanitarian, activist and politician 
 Kristin Halvorsen (born 1960), former leader of Socialist Left Party, Govt. Minister
 Vibeke Hein Bæra (born 1964) a Norwegian lawyer, defended Anders Behring Breivik at his trial
 Robin Kåss (born 1977) a Norwegian politician, Mayor of Porsgrund 2015 & 2019
 Torbjørn Røe Isaksen (born 1978), former leader of Norwegian Young Conservatives, Minister of Education and Research
 brothers Kjetil Aleksander Lie (born 1980) & Espen Lie (born 1984) Norwegian chess players

Business 
 Hans Eleonardus Møller Sr. (1780–1860) a Norwegian businessperson
 Jørgen Wright Cappelen (1805–1878) a bookseller and publisher, co-founded Cappelen Damm
 Johan Jeremiassen (1843-1889) an entrepreneur, ship-owner, consul and politician; founded the porcelain flatware company Porsgrund Porselænsfabrik
 Petter Stordalen (born 1962) a Norwegian billionaire businessman, real estate developer and hotel owner

The Arts 

 Halfdan Christensen (1873–1950) a Norwegian stage actor and theatre director
 Tone Schwarzott (born 1941) a Norwegian actress and poet 
 Yngvar Numme (born 1944) a Norwegian singer, actor, revue writer and director 
 Bugge Wesseltoft (born 1964) a Norwegian jazz musician, pianist, composer and producer
 Stephen Ackles (born 1966) a Norwegian vocalist, pianist, and songwriter
 Øyvind Torvund (born 1976) a Norwegian composer
 Aleksander Walmann (born 1986) singer for Norway in the Eurovision Song Contest 2017
 Linda Aslaksen (born 1986) also known as Zina, a Sámi artist and educator
 Didrik Solli-Tangen (born 1987) singer for Norway in the Eurovision Song Contest 2010
 Emil Solli-Tangen (born 1990) a Norwegian opera singer

Sport 

 Jørgen Juve (1906–1983) a Norwegian football player, jurist, journalist and non-fiction writer; highest scoring player for Norway, 33 goals in 45 games; captain of Norway, which won Olympic bronze medals in the 1936 Summer Olympics
 Cathrine Roll-Matthiesen (born 1967) a former handball player, team silver medallist at the 1988 & 1992 Summer Olympics
 sisters Anita Valen (born 1968) & Monica Valvik (born 1970), Norwegian racing cyclists, won the Norwegian National Road Race Championships eleven times between them
 Ronny Deila (born 1975) football manager, head coach of New York City FC and former player with 352 club caps 
 Tony Capaldi (born 1981), professional footballer, nearly 300 club caps
 Rune Jarstein (born 1984) a football goalkeeper with about 400 club caps and 69 for Norway
 Espen Ruud (born 1984) a football defender with 430 club caps and 35 for Norway
 Fredrik Nordkvelle (born 1985) a footballer with 360 club caps

Twin towns – sister cities

Porsgrunn is twinned with:
 Kisumu, Kenya
 Pori, Finland
 Sigtuna, Sweden
 Sønderborg, Denmark
 Sundsvall, Sweden

References

Footnotes

Books

 Harald Hals (1968). Eidanger bygdehistorie. Brødrene Kjaer Boktrykkeri.
 Johan N. Tønnessen (1956–1957). Porsgrunns historie.
 Ole Georg Moseng (2006). Porsgrunns historie . Bind I . Byen i emning .
 Ellen Schrumpf (2006). Porsgrunns historie . Bind II . Byen ved elva.

External links

Municipal fact sheet from Statistics Norway

Municipal website 
Porsgrunds Porselænsfabrik AS (porcelain factory) 
www.isola.com 
Porsgrunn public library 

 
Municipalities of Vestfold og Telemark
Cities and towns in Norway
Port cities and towns in Norway
Port cities and towns of the North Sea